TRC may refer to:

Business
 TÜV Rheinland Consulting, a privately held German product certification service company

Media and popular culture 
 TRC (band) a British hardcore punk and rap band
 The Red Chord, an American music group
 The Rural Channel, a Canadian English language specialty channel

Organizations 
 Texas Railroad Commission, which regulates energy in Texas, U.S.
 Textile Research Centre, a research institute in Leiden, the Netherlands
 The RNAi Consortium, a genetic research partnership
 Truth and reconciliation commission
 Truth and Reconciliation Commission (disambiguation), several organizations
 Truth and Reconciliation Commission (South Africa), the most well-known one

Science and technology 
 TRC or Row Cycle Time, one of computer memory timings
 TRC, several models of boomboxes by Lasonic
 Tone reproduction curve in imaging, also known as tone response curve
 Textile-reinforced concrete, a type of reinforced concrete in which the usual steel reinforcing bars are replaced by textile materials
 Technical Requirement Checklist, a checklist mainly used to verify the technical requirement for a platform in video game testing

Sports 
 Thames Rowing Club, a rowing club in London, England
 Triangle Ribbon Championship, a women's professional wrestling competition
 The Rugby Championship, an international rugby union competition

Transportation 
 Tanzania Railways Corporation, a state-owned enterprise that runs one of Tanzania's two main railway networks
 Toronto Railway Company, a defunct streetcar operator in Toronto, Ontario, Canada
 Transportation Research Center, an automotive proving ground in Ohio, United States
 Torreón International Airport, an airport in Coahuila, Mexico with IATA airport code TRC
 Trona Railway, a short-line railway in the Mojave Desert with reporting mark TRC

Other uses 
 Tradable Renewable Certificates, non-tangible energy commodities in the United States
 Trade Reference Currency, a conceptual world currency
 The Russian Campaign, a board game originally published by Jedko games and then republished by Avalon Hill, L2 Design Group and soon by Consim Press

See also